Colonel George C. Thilenius House, also known as Longview, is a historic home located at Cape Girardeau, Missouri.  It was built between 1870 and 1873, and is a -story, painted red brick dwelling with Greek Revival style design elements.  It sits on a stuccoed sandstone foundation and has a cross-gable roof. Also on the property are the remains of the old Thilenius Winery.

It was listed on the National Register of Historic Places in 1983.

References

Houses on the National Register of Historic Places in Missouri
Greek Revival houses in Missouri
Houses completed in 1873
Houses in Cape Girardeau County, Missouri
National Register of Historic Places in Cape Girardeau County, Missouri